The Nebraska Cornhuskers softball team represents the University of Nebraska–Lincoln in the Big Ten Conference of NCAA Division I. The program was founded in 1976 as a club sport and became an officially sanctioned varsity sport the next year. NU plays its home games at Bowlin Stadium, constructed in 2001 as part of the Haymarket Park complex. Nebraska has made twenty-five appearances in the NCAA Division I softball tournament, with seven Women's College World Series berths. The team has been coached by Rhonda Revelle since 1993.

History

Early success
Nebraska's softball program began in 1976 as a club sport, and was officially sanctioned as a varsity sport in 1977 in the wake of Title IX. Don Isherwood led the program in its early years, but was fired in 1980 as the university wished to hire a head coach with a college degree. That coach was Nancy Plantz, who led Nebraska to the inaugural NCAA Division I Women's College World Series in 1982 (in its early years, the softball tournament was held in Omaha, longtime host of the College World Series, meaning NU played the 1982, 1984, 1985, and 1987 WCWS less than fifty miles from its Lincoln campus). Plantz's tenure ended following a disastrous 1983 season that featured player walkouts and a last-place conference finish, and ultimately was cut short by the university.

Nebraska was nearly unable to field a team for the 1984 season before hiring former NAIA National Coach of the Year Wayne Daigle to lead the program. The Cornhuskers set a school record for wins and returned to the WCWS in Daigle's first year, and Denise Day was named the first All-American in program history. Daigle's second season saw the breakout of freshman pitcher Lori Sippel, whose no-hitter against Louisiana Tech in the WCWS opener helped send the Cornhuskers to the title game for the first time, where they lost 2–1 to UCLA. Just months after the end of the tournament, Nebraska'a national runner-up finish was vacated by the  NCAA Committee on Infractions; according to the committee's findings, Daigle had allowed a redshirt player to travel with the team and purchased dinner for a recruit and her family. This also made NU ineligible for postseason play following the 1986 season, which would be Daigle's last at Nebraska; he resigned and returned to Texas, where he coached high school softball for the remainder of his career.

Athletic director Bob Devaney selected pitching coach and Nebraska native Ron Wolforth as Daigle's successor. Wolforth led Nebraska back to the WCWS in each of his first two seasons, NU's fourth and fifth appearances in the event's first seven years. However, Wolforth's teams saw less success over the following years, and he grew weary of the NCAA's increasingly stringent rules and guidelines. He resigned in 1992 and started a baseball and softball academy in Vancouver.

Rhonda Revelle era
Devaney hired former Cornhusker pitcher Rhonda Revelle to replace Wolforth in 1993. Revelle inherited a program which hadn't made the NCAA Tournament since making the College World Series in 1988, but quickly returned the program to national relevance. NU did not miss the tournament from 1995 to 2007 and finished nationally ranked in every season but one. In 1998, Nebraska returned to the College World Series for the first time in a decade and became the first undefeated conference season in Big 12 history. Revelle became the third person to reach the WCWS as a player and a head coach, and the first to do it at their alma mater. Nebraska followed by winning fifty games in three straight seasons, culminating in another WCWS appearance in 2002, where NU was eliminated with a pair of one-run losses.

Nebraska's run of twelve consecutive top-25 national finishes ended in 2007, and the following year the program missed the NCAA Tournament for the first time since 1994. Nebraska returned to the tournament in 2010, and in 2011 the program beat a top-ranked team for the first time, a 1–0 win over Florida. The University of Nebraska–Lincoln joined the Big Ten in 2012, and in its second year in the conference NU advanced to the WCWS. On March 13, 2013, Nebraska swept Oklahoma State in a double-header, giving Revelle her 767th and 768th victories at NU and passing former baseball coach John Sanders for the most victories by any coach at Nebraska. Nebraska won the Big Ten for the first time in 2014, losing in a Super Regional to Alabama.

In 2019, Revelle was placed on paid administrative leave by the university after multiple player complaints of emotional abuse and harassing text messages. Several colleagues and former players voiced support for Revelle, who was later reinstated with no further punishment. Revelle won her 1,000th game at Nebraska in 2021, a season in which NU played only conference games due to COVID-19 travel restrictions.

Bowlin Stadium

Bowlin Stadium, part of the Haymarket Park complex in downtown Lincoln, has been the home venue of Nebraska's softball team since 2002. It has a listed capacity of 2,500, including 750 chairback seats with room for approximately two thousand more guests in metal bleachers down the first base line and all-grass berms down both foul lines. Nebraska has ranked in the top ten nationally in attendance four times since moving to Bowlin Stadium. The highest recorded attendance at the stadium was on April 9, 2016, when a crowd of 2,302 watched Michigan defeat Nebraska 4–1. Bowlin Stadium is adjacent to the larger Hawks Field, which hosts Nebraska's baseball team.

The stadium has hosted five NCAA Regionals. The Kentucky bluegrass playing surface at Bowlin Stadium was named the collegiate softball "Field of the Year" in 2004 by the Sports Field Management Association.

Coaches

Coaching history

Coaching staff

Awards

All-Americans

Conference awards

Season-by-season results

Notes

References

 
Sports in Lincoln, Nebraska